El Universal may refer to the following Spanish-language publications:

El Universal (Cartagena), a Colombian newspaper established in 1948
El Universal (Mexico City), a Mexican newspaper established in 1916
El Universal Ilustrado, a Mexican literary magazine published from 1917 to 1928
El Universal (Caracas), a Venezuelan newspaper established in 1909

See also
The Herald Mexico: A joint venture between El Universal (Mexico City) and The Miami Herald from 2004 to 2007
Universal (disambiguation)